Halla Bantu Halla is a novel written by Shrinivas B. Vaidya. Vaidya won the 2008 Sahitya Akademi Award for this novel. The novel tells a story of a village in north Karnataka, gives insight of the social and political upheavals in the village in a span of a century from 1853 to 1947, as observed from an elder person of the village.

References

2008 Indian novels
Kannada novels
Sahitya Akademi Award-winning works